Radio Plus is a Hercegovina commercial radio station, broadcasting from Posušje, Bosnia and Herzegovina.

Radio Plus was launched in 2007.

Frequencies
 Posušje

References

External links 
 www.radioplus.ba
 Communications Regulatory Agency of Bosnia and Herzegovina

See also 
List of radio stations in Bosnia and Herzegovina

Posušje
Radio stations established in 2007